The following is a list of regions of Ancient Anatolia, also known as "Asia Minor," in the present day Anatolia region of Turkey in Western Asia.

Late Bronze Age regions (circa 1200 BC)

Alasiya / Alashiya (later Cyprus in the Classical Age, to the south of mainland Anatolia or Asia Minor)
Assuwa, roughly most part of West Asia Minor / Anatolia, it was a confederation (or league) of 22 ancient Anatolian states that formed some time before 1400 BC (may have been the origin of the name Asia)
Adadura
Alatra
Assuwa Proper 
Dura
Dunda
Ḥalluwa
Ḥuwallušiya
Karakisa / Karkiya (later Caria in the Classical Age)
Kispuwa
Kuruppiya
Land of Mount Pahurina
Luissa, a name ending in -luišša (or the whole name Luišša)
Lukka / Lugga (later Lycia in the Classical Age)
Parista
Pasuhalta
Taruisa (later Troas / Troad? in the Classical Age) (Wilusa / Wilusiya was the capital, has been identified with the city called Ilion / Troy by the Greeks)
Wilusa (was the capital of Taruisa, has been identified with the city called Ilion / Troy by the Greeks)
Unaliya
Waršiya / Waršiyalla (Warsiya / Warsiyalla)
a name probably ending in -wwa,
Unknown (an obliterated name)
Unknown (an obliterated name)
Unknown (an obliterated name)
Arzawa, roughly part of West Asia Minor / Anatolia, it was formed in the second half of the 2nd millennium BC (roughly from the late 15th century BC until the beginning of the 12th century BC). Successor to Assuwa in Western Anatolia (capital was known as Apasa by the Hittites, later called Ephesos by the Greeks).
Arzawa Proper, may have been the classical region called Lydia or Maeonia, the then capital was known as Apasa by the Hittites, later called Ephesos by the Greeks, Classical Age capital of Lydia or Maeonia was Sardis and not Ephesus that was then a Greek city.
Included several of the same regions or lands as the Assuwa League but not the ones that are mentioned below:
Known western Anatolian late-Bronze Age regions and/or political entities which, to date, have not been cited as having been part of the Arzawa complex are:
Karkiya (later Caria in the Classical Age) (one of its main coastal cities was called Millawanda by the Hittites, later called Miletos by the Greeks)
Lukka / Lugga (later Lycia in the Classical Age)
Masa / Land of Masa (later Mysia? in the Classical Age)
Hittite Arzawa / Hittite Assuwa, formed by three western provinces (after Hittite Empire conquest), roughly most of Asia Minor / Anatolia, it was almost identical to the "Assuwa League" lands or regions, more than to Arzawa, that seems to have been smaller and less powerful.
Hapalla / Haballa (Eastern Arzawa - may have been the upper Sangarios river (today's Sakarya) basin, and the classical regions or parts of east Phrygia, western Galatia and also Masa or Mysia)
Appawiya / Abbawiya (may have been later Abbaitis in the Classical Age?)
Hulana River Land
Masa or Mysia
Phrygia, East Classical 
Pitassa
Upper Sangarios river basin (known as Saḫiriya by the Hittites)
Walma
Mira / Mira-Kuwaliya (Southern Arzawa - Caria and Lukka / Lycia, contrary to what is shown on the map)
Caria
Zippasla
Lukka / Lycia
Kuwaliya (later Cabalia in the Classical Age) (Kuwaliya > *Kubaliya > Kabaliya - Cabalia)
Siyanta / Siyanda
Seha / Seha River Land (Northern Arzawa - Lydia or Maeonia, Seha probably was the river that Greeks called Hermos, today's Gediz, flowed)
Sardis ( Lydian: 𐤮𐤱𐤠𐤭𐤣 Sfard; City on Hermos River. May share etymology with Seha)
Lazpa (later Lesbos Island in the Classical Age)
Lydia / Maeonia
Azzi-Hayasa / Hayasa-Azzi (later Lesser Armenia / Armenia Minor? in the Classical Age)
Hatti / Land of Hatti (Broad Sense - Central Anatolia including the lands that were Hittite or Nesite speaking at the height of the Hittite Empire and was also used as synonym of Hittite Empire and countries and regions, lands, ruled by it)
Hatti / Land of Hatti (Narrow Sense - Ancient country or land of Central Anatolia defined by the Halys river bend, called Marassanta or Marassantiya by the Hittites) (it was the core land of the Hittite empire and was also used as synonym of Hittite Empire and countries and regions ruled by it) (later it was part of Cappadocia and West Pontus)
Hattusa (capital of the Hittite Empire for longest time)
Katerra Udnē ("Lowland" in Hittite) (Plateau of Central Anatolia) (later mostly part of Cappadocia and may have included some parts of Lycaonia or not, Lycaonia was mostly Luwian speaking or to a more closely related language and not Hittite / Nesite speaking) (German name on the map: Unteres Land) (Katerra Udnē was possibly related to the name Katta Peda - "Place Below" or "Place Down", from katta - "below" or "down", and peda - "place", that originated the name Cappadocia through the possible phonetic change - Katt(a)-peda > *Kat-peda > *Kat-pata > *Kat-patu + ka > Kat-patuka > *Kappaduka, borrowed to Greek as Kappadokía)
Purushanda (an important city in Katerra Udnē - Lowland)
Kussara / Kusshara country in East Anatolia, south of the Marassantiya / Halys river, to the east of Nesa region or country.
Nesa, original land of the Hittites / Nesites who called themselves by the name Nesumines - "(people) from Nesa" and their language Nesili - "(language) from Nesa". "Nesa" was the name not only of a city but also of a region or country south of the middle Marassantiya / Halys river course.
Nesa city / Kanesh city, first capital of the Hittites and Hittite Empire, was the capital of the region of the same name.
Sarazzi Udnē ("Highland" in Hittite) (Mountains of East Anatolia, especially the upper Marassantiya / Halys basin) (later part of Cappadocia, West Pontus and Lesser Armenia / Armenia Minor) (German name on the map: Oberes Land)
Zalpa / Zalpuwa / "Land of Zalpa", region, country, on the Anatolian (Asia Minor) Black Sea / Pontus Euxinos coast (part of south coast of the Black Sea). Hittites called the Black Sea - "Zalpa Sea" or "Sea of Zalpa".
Zalpa / Zalpuwa city, a yet undiscovered Bronze Age Anatolian city that was the capital of the region of the same name.
Kaska / Kaska Land (East Pontus in the Classical Age) (country or region of the Kaska people, they could be descendants or related to the Hattians)
Luwiya / Luwa (seems to have included most part of Southern and Southeastern Anatolia that was Luwian speaking) (it was related but not identical to Assuwa and its successor Arzawa in Western Anatolia)
Hulaya (later Isauria? in the Classical Age)
Isuwa (later Melitene and Sophene in the Classical Age) (Melid was its main centre) 
Kammanu (region or country and also post-Hittite Luwian state in the first millennium BC) (its main city was Melid, later Melitene, today's Malatya)
Kizzuwadna / Kizzuwatna (Luwian: Kizz Uwadna / Kizz Uwatna - "Land on this Side", from kizz - "on this side" and uwadna or uwatna - "land" or "country"; Hittite: Kez Udnē - "Land on this Side", from kez - "on this side" and udnē - "land" or "country") (later Cilicia Pedias / Cilicia Campestris in the Classical Age)
Ḫiyawa / Adanawa, native names by the Luwians (Quwê for the Assyrians, Hume for the Babylonians, Keveh for ancient Israelites / Hebrews) (region or country and also post-Hittite Luwian state in the first millennium BC) (later part of Cilicia Pedias / Cilicia Campestris in the Classical Age). By the Hittites it was called Danuna / "Land of the Danuna", the region of Adana, Adaniya or Ataniya city and region, in Cilicia. It may have been the region where the people called Denyen by the ancient Egyptians, one of the Sea peoples, originally came from.
Khilakku (region or country and also post-Hittite Luwian state in the first millennium BC) (later part of Cilicia Pedias / Cilicia Campestris in the Classical Age)
Kurkuma (Gurgum) (region or country and also post-Hittite Luwian state in the first millennium BC)
Tuwana / Tuwanuwa (later Tyanitis in the Classical Age)
Tabal (region or country and also post-Hittite Luwian state in the first millennium BC) (Tuwana > *Tuwan(a) > *Tuwan > *Tuban > *Tubal > Tabal) (this name may have been the inspiration for the Old Hebrew name Tubal, son of Japheth, son of Noah, in the Bible)
Tarhuntassa (later Cilicia Trachaea / Cilicia Aspera), Tarhuntassa was the name not only of a city but also of a region or country in south Anatolia.
Tarhuntassa city, Tarhuntas Assa - "Tarhunt city" (one of the capitals of Hittite Empire in a country or region of the same name)
Zanta Uwadna - Plateau of Central Anatolia. Luwian cognate and equivalent to Hittite Katerra Udnē - "Lowland" in Hittite (may have included some parts or most part of Lycaonia or not, Lycaonia was mostly Luwian speaking or to a more closely related language and not Hittite / Nesite speaking) (German name on the map: Unteres Land)
Pala (for the Hittites seems to have included most part of Northern Asia Minor / Anatolia between rivers Marassantiya to the east, Sahiriya to the west and Zalpa Sea / Sea of Zalpa to the north, that was Palaic speaking) (later Paphlagonia in the Classical Age)
Arawana
Kalasma
Kassiya
Kasula
Pala proper (later Paphlagonia in the Classical Age)
Tumanna (later Domanitis? in the Classical Age)

Regions sometimes included in Anatolia
Kummuh / Kummaha (region or country and also post-Hittite Luwian state in the first millennium BC) (later Commagena in the Classical Age) (although it was on the south slope of the Taurus Mountains it could be considered geographically in Anatolia / Asia Minor)
Palistin / Walistin (later Pieria in Classical Age) (may have been the original region of the Philistines?)
Pattin / Pattina (later Pieria in Classical Age) (known as Unqi by the Assyrians)

Classical Age regions (circa 200 BC)

Aeolis (named after the Aeolian Greeks that colonized the region)
Lesbos
Armenia Minor (Armenia west of the Euphrates river, geographically in Anatolia) (roughly corresponding to ancient Azzi-Hayasa or Hayasa-Azzi)
Aeretice / Æretice
Aetulane / Ætulane
Orbalisene
Orbesine
Orsene
Bithynia
Bithynia Proper (named after the Bithyni)
Cauconia (named after the Caucones or Kaukauni)
Mariandynia (named after the Mariandyni)
Salone / Salon (Bithynium or Bithynion was its main centre)
Tarsia
Tottaion
Thynia (named after the Thyni)
Cappadocia (a significant part roughly corresponding to ancient "Land of Hatti" or Hatti) (name possibly derived from the Hittite Katta Peda- - Place Below or Place Down, from katta - below or down and peda - place; possible phonetic change - Katt(a)-peda > *Kat-peda > *Kat-pata > *Kat-patu + ka > Kat-patuka > *Kappaduka, borrowed to Greek as Kappadokía)
Bagadania / Bagadoania
Chammamene / Chammanene
Cataonia (broad sense) (During Achaemenid Persian Empire it was its own country or region and not part of Cappadocia)
Aravene
Cataonia / Cataonia Proper (narrow sense)
Lavinianesine / Lavianesine / Laviansene
Muriane / Murianune
Cappadocian Cilicia / Mazakene (where Mazaka or Caesarea Mazaka was located; it is today's Kayseri) (Nesa was close)
Garsaouritis / Garsauria
Melitene / Miletene (During Achaemenid Persian Empire it was its own country or region and not part of Cappadocia)
Morimene
Pteria
Saravene
Tarbasthena
Sargarausene
Tyanitis (after Tyana city) (roughly corresponding to ancient Tuwana / Tuwanuwa region)
Caria
Peraea
Cilicia
Cilicia Pedias / Cilicia Campestris (roughly corresponding to ancient Kizzuwadna)
Bryelice / Bryelica
Cilicia Trachaea / Cilicia Aspera (roughly corresponding to ancient Tarhuntassa) (later, Cilicia Aspera was included in Isauria)
Characine
Lalassis 
Lamotis
Kennatis
Ketis
Selenitis (after Selinus city)
Cyprus (roughly corresponding to ancient Alasiya, part or the whole island)
Doris (named after the Dorian Greeks that colonized the region)
Cos
Doric Hexapolis
Rhodes
Galatia (named after the Galatians, a Celtic people, that arrived in Central Anatolia by the early 3rd century BC, it didn't exist until then and was made by Galatian conquests of parts of Phrygia and Cappadocia)
Tolistobogii / Tolistobogioi subregion (Western Galatia) (where Gordion / Gordium, ancient Phrygian capital, was located, Pessinus was Tolisbogii capital)
Comata / Komata
Gordiana (was part of Phrygia until Galatian conquest, where Gordion / Gordium, ancient Phrygian capital, was located,)
Pancaleia / Pankaleia (was part of Phrygia until Galatian conquest)
Proseilemmene / Proseilimmene (was part of Phrygia until Galatian conquest)
Tectosages subregion (Central Galatia) (where Ancyra was located, today's Ankara)
Komodromos (was part of Cappadocia until Galatian conquest)
Sanisene (was part of Cappadocia until Galatian conquest)
Trocmi / Trokmoi subregion (Eastern Galatia) (where Tavium was located, close to ancient Hattusa)
Ximene (was part of Cappadocia until Galatian conquest)
Ionia (named after the Ionian Greeks that colonized the region)
Chios
Icaria / Ikaria
Samos
Isauria
Lycaonia
Antiochiana
Axylos
Lycia
Cabalia (roughly corresponding to ancient Kuwaliya)
Milyas (region dwelt by the Milyae that descend from the Solymi)
Lydia / Maeonia
Katakekaumene
Mysia (Coastal Phrygia) (also known as Phrygia Hellespontica, or as Phrygia Epictetus after the annexation by the Kingdom of Pergamum) (roughly corresponding to ancient Masa)
Phrygia Minor (northern part of Mysia)
Lentiana
Phrygia Maior / Phrygia Pergamene (southern part of Mysia)
Abrettene
Morene
Olympene
Teuthrania (sometimes included in Lydia) (Pergamon, that was capital of the Kingdom of Pergamon, was in this land)
Pamphylia
Paphlagonia (roughly corresponding to ancient Pala)
Blaene
Cimiatene
Domanitis (roughly corresponding to ancient Tumanna?)
Enetia / Henetia (named after the Eneti or Heneti)
Marmolitis
Pimolisene
Potamia
Timonitis
Phrygia (Inland Phrygia)
Pacatiana / Phrygia Pacatiana (Western Phrygia)
Abbaitis (roughly corresponding to ancient Abbawiya or Appawiya)
Azanitis
Salutaris / Phrygia Salutaris (Eastern Phrygia)
Pisidia
Paroreios / Parorea
Pontus
Western Pontus (During Achaemenid Persian Empire it was part of Cappadocia) (roughly corresponding to ancient "Land of Zalpa", Zalpa or Zalpuwa was its main centre)
Chiliokomon
Camisene / Kamisene / Comisene
Colopene / Kolopene / Culupene / Calupene
Daximonitis
Diacopene
Gadilonitis / Gazelonitis
Phanaraea
Phazemonitis
Saramene
Themiscyra
Tibarenia (named after the Tibareni, believed to be of Scythian origin by several classical authors like Herodotus, Xenophon and Strabo)
Eastern Pontus (roughly corresponding to ancient "Kaska Land", inhabited by the Kaska people) (inhabited by several peoples)
Byzeria (named after the Byzeres)
Chaldia (named after the Chalybes)
Macronia (named after the Macrones, ancestors of Mingrelians, part of the Zan)
Marria (named after the Marres)
Moschia (named after the Moschi or Moschoi, who may have been a northern branch of the Eastern Mushki and related to Mysians and Armenians)
Mossynoecia (named after the Mossynoeci)
Sannia (named after the Sanni, ancestors of the Zan, including Mingrelians and Lazs)
Troas / Troad (sometimes included in Mysia)
Sigrene

Regions sometimes included in Anatolia
Commagene (roughly corresponding to ancient Kummaha or Kummuh) (although it was on the south slope of the Taurus Mountains, it could be considered geographically in Anatolia / Asia Minor) (however it was administratively included in Roman Syria, far northern area, by the Roman Empire)
Pieria (part of ancient Palistin) (although administratively in Roman Syria on the border area, it was on the west slope of the Amanus mountains, and sometimes it was included in Cilicia Pedias)

Note: Over time the regions did not always were the same and had the same size or the same borders and sometimes included different subregions, districts, divisions or parts or were united with others.

The names of many regions ended in "e" [e] that was the Eastern Greek (Attic Ionic Ancient Greek) equivalent to the Western Greek (Doric Greek) "a" [a] and also to the Latin "a" [a].
In Ancient Greek the "ph" represented the consonants p [p] and h [h] pronounced closely and not the f [f] consonant.
In Ancient Greek the "y" represented the vowel [y] (ü) and not the semivowel [j] or the vowels [i] or [I].

Byzantine Anatolian Themes (circa 1000 AD)

The Themata were combined Military and Administrative divisions of the Byzantine Empire (East Roman Empire) which replaced the Roman provincial system in the 7th-8th century and reached their height in the 9th and 10th centuries.
Aegean Sea (was a naval theme which included the modern Greek islands of Lesbos, Chios and the Cyclades; the coastal areas of Troad and Mysia, as well as the Hellespont or modern day Dardanelles and the Gallipoli Peninsula. Main cities included Abydos (Hellespont), Cyzicus and Kallipolis).
Anatolic Theme
Armeniac Theme
Bucellarian Theme
Cappadocia (theme)
Chaldia Theme
Charsianon
Cibyrrhaeot Theme
Cyprus (theme) (the island could be included in Asia Minor or Anatolia, although not continental)
Koloneia (theme)
Lykandos
Mesopotamia (theme)
Opsikion
Optimatoi
Paphlagonia (theme)
Iberia (which incorporated the historical region of Phasiane)
Samos (theme)
Sebasteia (theme)
Seleucia (theme)
Thracesian Theme
Ducates or Catepanates (combined Military and Administrative divisions of the Byzantine Empire (East Roman Empire) on border regions that included smaller Themata under the command of a Dux or Katepano)
Ducate or Catepanate of Antioch
Kilikia (Cilicia)
Ducate or Catepanate of Chaldia
Chaldia Theme
Koloneia (theme)
Ducate or Catepanate of Mesopotamia
Melitene
Mesopotamia (roughly matching East Melitene)
Keltzine (on the western banks of the Euphrates, on the Anatolian side)

Regions sometimes included in Anatolia
Euphrates Cities (Pareuphratídai Póleis) (roughly matching ancient Commagene and part of the Catepanate of Mesopotamia)

See also
Historical regions of Anatolia
Geography of ancient Anatolia
Neo-Hittite kingdoms

External links

+
 
 
Regions of Anatolia
Geography of Western Asia
History of Western Asia
Regions of Asia